Oh, What a Mighty Time is an album by the country rock band the New Riders of the Purple Sage.  Their sixth studio album and their seventh album overall, it was released by Columbia Records in 1975.

Oh, What a Mighty Time was produced by Bob Johnston.  Jerry Garcia of the Grateful Dead plays guitar on three songs, and Sly Stone plays keyboards and sings on one song.

Track listing
"Mighty Time" (Don Nix) – 5:13
"I Heard You Been Layin' My Old Lady" (Russell Wier) – 3:24
"Strangers on a Train" (Skip Battin, Kim Fowley) – 2:45
"Up Against the Wall, Redneck Mother" (Ray Wylie Hubbard) – 4:13
"Take a Letter, Maria" (R. B. Greaves) – 4:07
"Little Old Lady" (Richard Wilbur) – 2:52
"On Top of Old Smoky" (traditional, arranged and adapted by Frank Wakefield) – 2:39
"Over and Over" (John Dawson) – 3:08
"La Bamba" (Ritchie Valens) – 3:44
"Going Round the Horn" (Dawson, Wakefield) – 3:33
"Farewell, Angelina" (Bob Dylan) – 2:42

Personnel

New Riders of the Purple Sage
John Dawson – guitars, vocals, autoharp, mouth harp, baby guitar, percussion, Acme siren
David Nelson – guitars, vocals, percussion, regular tuning Heineken's bottle
Buddy Cage – pedal steel, vocal
Skip Battin – bass, vocals, percussion
Spencer Dryden – drums, percussion, vocal

Additional musicians
Sly Stone – vocals, organ, piano on "Mighty Time"
Jerry Garcia – guitar on "Mighty Time", "I Heard You Been Layin' My Old Lady", and "Take a Letter, Maria"
Jeff Narell – steel drum on "Over and Over"
Pepper Watkins, Bootche Anderson, Marilyn Scott – vocals on "I Heard You Been Layin' My Old Lady", "Strangers on a Train", "Up Against the Wall, Redneck", and "Take a Letter, Maria"
Ray Park – fiddle on "Going Round the Horn"
St. Beulah's Church Choir – vocals on "Mighty Time"
Portion of Glide Memorial Church Choir – vocals on "Mighty Time"
Patty Santos Cockrell, Peña Blanca, Lucha Cardenas – vocals on "Over and Over", "La Bamba"
The Senator – vocals on "Over and Over"
Andrea Ahlgren – vocals on "Over and Over"

Production
Bob Johnston – producer
Joe Garnett – front cover illustration
Ron Kriss – back cover illustration
Herb Greene – cover and inside photography
Tyler Thornton – back cover photography
Bob DeSantos – color prints
Ron Coro – design

Notes

New Riders of the Purple Sage albums
1975 albums
Albums produced by Bob Johnston
Columbia Records albums